Anita: Speaking Truth to Power is an 2013 American documentary film, written, directed, and produced by Freida Mock. It follows Anita Hill, a lawyer who testified against Clarence Thomas's Supreme Court nomination, exposing the problem of sexual harassment around the world.

The film had its world premiere at the Sundance Film Festival on January 20, 2013. It was released on March 21, 2014, by Samuel Goldwyn Films.

Synopsis
The film follows lawyer Anita Hill who testifies against Clarence Thomas's Supreme Court nomination, exposing the problem of sexual harassment around the world. It also follows Hill after the testimony as she continues to raise awareness of sexual harassment in the workplace.

Release
The film had its world premiere at the Sundance Film Festival on January 20, 2013. It also screened at the AFI Docs on June 22, 2013. In August 2013, Samuel Goldwyn Films acquired U.S. distribution rights to the film. It was released on March 21, 2014.

Reception

Critical reception
Anita: Speaking Truth to Power It holds a 79% approval rating on review aggregator website Rotten Tomatoes, based on 33 reviews, with a weighted average of 6.70/10. On Metacritic, the film holds a rating of 68 out of 100, based on 15 critics, indicating "generally favorable reviews".

References

External links
 
 
 
 

2013 films
2013 documentary films
American documentary films
Documentary films about women
Documentary films about African Americans
Films about sexual abuse
Samuel Goldwyn Films films
2010s English-language films
2010s American films